The Minister of Internal Affairs (Faroese: landsstýrismaðurin í innlendismálum or innlendismálaráðharrin) is responsible for the municipalities, the isolated and distant small islands (Útoyggjar), the infrastructure, police, the court, environment, issues regarding immigrants and the administration of Faroese political elections. For a short period in 2008 under Jóannes Eidesgaards second cabinet, this cabinet was called Ministry of Justice, but it was responsible for the same affairs.

See also 

 Justice ministry
 Politics of the Faroe Islands

References 

Internal
Faroe Islands